Birthmarks is the third album by Ozark Henry.

Track listing
Music and lyrics by Piet Goddaer.

"Word up" – 4:39
"Rescue" – 3:47
"Do you love me" – 4:02
"Sweet instigator" – 4:20
"Seaside" – 3:30
"Intersexual" – 4:17
"Rainbow" – 5:30
"Tattoo" – 7:00
"I'll be rain" – 4:14
"This is all I have" – 3:47

CD bonus

"Sweet Instigator [Roof Remix]" – 4:15
"A Sunzoo Seminar" – 3:46
"Rescue [Roof Remix]" – 3:53
"Word Up [Roof Remix]" – 4:36
"Seaside [Roof Remix]" – 3:25

Charts

Weekly charts

Year-end charts

Certifications

References

Ozark Henry albums
2001 albums